Charles Isiah Faddis (June 13, 1890April 1, 1972) was a Democratic member of the United States House of Representatives from Pennsylvania.

Early life and education
Charles I. Faddis was born in Loudonville, Ohio. He moved with his parents to Waynesburg, Pennsylvania, in 1891. He attended Waynesburg College, and graduated from the agricultural department of Pennsylvania State College at State College, Pennsylvania, in 1915.

Mexican and First World War Service
Faddis served as a sergeant in the Tenth Infantry, Pennsylvania National Guard, on the Mexican border in 1916. During the First World War he served with the Forty-seventh Regiment, United States Infantry, and the Fourth Ammunition Train. He rose to rank of lieutenant colonel of Infantry, and served in the Army of Occupation in Germany. During his service he was awarded the Purple Heart.

After the war, he was engaged in the general contracting business in Waynesburg, PA, from 1919 to 1926, but then he returned to attend the United States Army Command and General Staff College in Fort Leavenworth, Kansas, in 1930.

Representative from Pennsylvania
Faddis was elected as a Democrat to the Seventy-third and to the four succeeding Congresses and served from March 4, 1933, until his resignation on December 4, 1942, to enter the United States Army. He was an unsuccessful candidate for renomination in 1942.

Second World War Service
During the Second World War, Faddis was a colonel in the United States Army. During the war he was awarded the Purple Heart and the Bronze Star.

Post War Activities
After the war, he was engaged in raising Hereford cattle, producing oil and gas, and operating coal mines. He died in Mazatlán, Sinaloa, Mexico, and is buried in Rosemont Cemetery in Rogersville, Pennsylvania.

References
 Retrieved on 2008-02-16
The Political Graveyard

External links
 

1890 births
1972 deaths
United States Army personnel of World War II
United States Army Command and General Staff College alumni
People from Waynesburg, Pennsylvania
People from Loudonville, Ohio
Democratic Party members of the United States House of Representatives from Pennsylvania
Burials in Pennsylvania
20th-century American politicians
Military personnel from Pennsylvania